Breakthru is the self-released debut album by American singer-songwriter Antoniette Costa. It was released on her label L.I.P. Label 14 on March 1, 2005.

History
The album exhibits Costa's R&B and soul tendencies as a singer-songwriter. Some of the 12 tracks are piano ballads, while others are accompanied by a band. The album was dedicated to her recently deceased aunt, and featured 12 songs that had been written from middle-school to college. 
In honor of her aunt, who was an avid supporter of education, Costa donated a percentage of the album sales to the Rosalita Costa-Clark School Fund in Pittsburgh.

Release
Costa independently released the album on March 1, 2005 on her own record label L.I.P. Label 14. The album ranked No. 1 on Amazon's Early Adopter Indie Music Chart and No. 69 on the Early Adopter All Music Chart. It also led to Costa's future collaborations with members of The Roots.

Track listing

References

External links

2005 debut albums